Chemaudin et Vaux is a commune in the department of Doubs, eastern France. The municipality was established on 1 January 2017 by merger of the former communes of Chemaudin (the seat) and Vaux-les-Prés.

Population

See also 
Communes of the Doubs department

References 

Communes of Doubs